Belle Fiore Winery is a winery located off Dead Indian Memorial Road in Ashland, Oregon, United States. The  property features an Italian-style wine pavilion and a 19,045-square-foot French-inspired mansion built by Edward Kerwin in 2004. Kerwin remains the owner and manager .

Belle Fiore was recognized at the 2015 Oregon Wine Experience. The winery earned several gold and double gold medals at the 2019 San Francisco Chronicle Wine Competition. Belle Fiore's 2015 Terramisso Tempranillo earned a gold medal at the 28th annual Indy International Wine Competition (2019).

In 2016, Kerwin was cited and fined by the county for "operating a restaurant without approval and not using prepackaged foods as required by land-use statutes governing wineries on rural farmland". He was in a seven-year legal dispute with neighboring Ashland Gun and Archery Club until 2019.

References

External links

 
 
 Rosebud Original Video: So Famous Wine Belle Fiore Winery, Mail Tribune (April 14, 2019)

Ashland, Oregon
Wineries in Oregon
Commercial buildings completed in 2004